Senchenko is a surname of Ukrainian origin. Notable people with the surname include:

 Vyacheslav Senchenko (born 1977), Ukrainian boxer
 Andriy Senchenko, Ukrainian politician

Ukrainian-language surnames